Ceui (born January 31) is a Japanese singer–songwriter originally from Chiba, Japan, though she grew up in Fukuoka. Ceui's name is derived from the Portuguese word for sky, céu. She has been singing since 2000, but made her major debut in 2007 singing the ending theme for the anime series Shattered Angels, and since then has done songs for other anime including Sola, Sora o Miageru Shōjo no Hitomi ni Utsuru Sekai, Sora Kake Girl, and Aoi Hana. She has released eleven singles and released her major debut album Glassy Heaven on July 22, 2009.

Biography
Ceui was born in Chiba, Japan, though she grew up in Fukuoka. Due to the influence of her mother as a piano teacher, Ceui began learning classical piano at the age of six. As a young girl, she became interested in children's literature and poetry, and began writing verses herself. As a student, she was a member of the wind instrument club and choir. She went to Shirayuri Women's University where she graduated with a degree in Japanese literature.

In 2000, Ceui made a demo tape and was able to produce two six-track albums for the Japanese home furnishing store Francfranc entitled Spring Time and Autumn Mind; the albums were released via Filter Ink. Officially, these albums were released as "Francfranc's Bedside Music Selection featuring Ceui". In 2002, Ceui worked on a project CD with the Japanese apparel company Sanei-International for their clothing brand LUVLISH 'cos brilliant. In 2003, Ceui went on an overseas live tour with other artists sponsored by Filter Ink. On October 21, 2004, Ceui released an independent album titled Ashimoto ni Furu Ame: Raindrops falling on My Feet, which was sold in HMV stores nationwide in Japan. The same day, a project CD Ceui had worked on for the Japanese fortune teller Kaoruko Stella entitled Love Chance Music also went on sale. In 2006, Ceui provided a chorus to the blind Japanese pianist Kohshi Kishita.

Ceui made her major debut on Lantis' MellowHead music label brand with the release of her first single "Madoromi no Rakuen" in February 2007. Ceui would release one more single in 2007, "Mellow Melody", followed by another in 2008, "Kamigami no Uta". Ceui released five more singles in 2009, as well as her debut album Glassy Heaven in July 2009. Her ninth single "Truth Of My Destiny" was released in 2010.

In 2013, singer Annabel and Ceui collaborated on the split single "Phantasmagoria / Shall We Dance" for the original video animation series Hanayaka Nari, Waga Ichizoku: Kinetograph.

Discography

Singles
, released February 21, 2007
"Mellow Melody", released May 23, 2007
, released November 26, 2008
, released February 25, 2009
"Espacio", released May 13, 2009
, released May 27, 2009
, released August 5, 2009
, released August 26, 2009
"Truth Of My Destiny", released August 11, 2010
"Last Inferno", released October 27, 2010
"Stardust Melodia", released November 9, 2011
, released August 8, 2012
, released July 24, 2013
"Pandora", released November 5, 2014

Independent albums
Autumn Mind, released 2000
Spring Time, released 2000
, released October 21, 2004
First Eden, released May 3, 2011
 /  , released September 10, 2014
Pastel Eden, released May 20, 2015
Sympathia, released Aug. 10, 2018

Studio albums
Glassy Heaven, released July 22, 2009
Labyrintus, released June 12, 2012
Rapsodia, released December 26, 2012
Gabriel Code: Eden e Michibiku Hikari no Gakufu, released November 20, 2013

Compilations
Crystal3: Circus Vocal Collection Vol.3, released December 21, 2006
Oratorio, released August 8, 2007
@Lantis NonStop Dance Remix Vol.1, released April 23, 2008
Songs from Eternal Fantasy, released February 27, 2008
Brilliant World, released January 7, 2009
Sora o Miageru Shōjo no Hitomi ni Utsuru Sekai Inspired Album, released March 25, 2009
Koi to Senkyo to Chocolate Songs, released April 27, 2011
Asphodelus, released April 28, 2011
Shin'ai naru Sekai e, released April 28, 2011
Heart of Magic Garden, released June 27, 2012
Iro to Ridori no Hikari Theme Songs Plus, released August 15, 2012
Straight Sheep / Yume Kai Biyori, released August 24, 2012
Musōkyoku 〜Seeking Asphodelus〜, released October 24, 2012
Phantasmagoria / Sharui Dance, released January 23, 2013
Ashita e Shiori / Dear Smile, released January 25, 2013
Imasugu Oniichan ni Imoto datteiitai! Vocal Album, released March 27, 2013
Ao no kanata no Forizumu Vocal Album, released May 1, 2016
Twinkle Starlight ⁄ Worlds Pain, released July 27, 2016
Phyllis no Atelier: Fushigi na Tabi no Renkinjutsu-shi Vocal Album, released November 2, 2016

Best album
10th Anniversary Album - Anime - 'Akashic Record: Ruby''', released June 21, 201710th Anniversary Album - Game - 'Akashic Record: Sapphire''', released August 25, 2017

References

External links
Official website 
  

Anime musicians
Japanese women singer-songwriters
Lantis (company) artists
Living people
Musicians from Chiba Prefecture
Musicians from Fukuoka Prefecture
Year of birth missing (living people)
20th-century Japanese women singers
20th-century Japanese singers
21st-century Japanese women singers
21st-century Japanese singers